Tse Kwong Lam v Wong Chit Sen, is a land law case, concerning the rights and obligations of a mortgagee in the exercise of his power of sale under a mortgage.

Facts
Mr Wong exercised his power of sale and put up Mr Tse’s property for auction, a building with about 100 units in Kowloon, the Kwong Hing Building. It was only shortly advertised with limited details. The reserve price was fixed without the guidance of a qualified valuer at $1.2m. There was only one bid. It was Mrs Wong. She was acting on behalf of the company owned by Mr Wong and his family. They had apparently had a board meeting before resolving that they would bid up to a maximum of $1.2m.

The trial Judge found that $1.2m was not a proper price, but refused to set the sale aside because of the borrower’s delay in pursuing the counterclaim. He awarded damages instead. The Court of Appeal set aside the judge’s award.

Judgment
The Privy Council restored the judge’s award, holding that although the sale could not be set aside, given that too long was taken, damages could be awarded. There was a clear conflict of interest here, importing a necessity to show that reasonable precautions had been taken to get the best price. The Board advised that although the respondent was free to sell to a company in which he was interested, he had failed to demonstrate he had taken reasonable care in the conduct of the sale. An auction was not necessarily the most appropriate mode of sale. Expert advice should have been sought for valuing and the sale mode. Lord Templeman said:

See also

English land law
English trusts law
English property law
York Buildings Co v MacKenzie (1795) 3 Paton 378

References

Judicial Committee of the Privy Council cases on appeal from Hong Kong
1983 in Hong Kong
1983 in case law
Property case law
1983 in British law
Auction case law